The 1962–63 season was Newport County's first ever season in the Football League Fourth Division since relegation from the Third Division the previous season. It was their 35th competitive season overall in the Football League.

Season review

Results summary

Results by round

Fixtures and results

Fourth Division

FA Cup

Football League Cup

Welsh Cup

League table

References

 Amber in the Blood: A History of Newport County.

External links
 Newport County 1962-1963 : Results
 Newport County football club match record: 1963
 Welsh Cup 1962/63

1962-63
English football clubs 1962–63 season
1962–63 in Welsh football